David Bacon (born Gaspar Griswold Bacon, Jr., March 24, 1914 – September 12, 1943) was an American stage and film actor.

Early life 
Bacon was born in Barnstable, Massachusetts, and his family was one of the prominent, politically active Boston Brahmin families. His father, Gaspar G. Bacon, was on the board of Harvard University, and later, in the 1930s, served as lieutenant governor of Massachusetts.

Born to a life of privilege and wealth, David Bacon attended Deerfield Academy and graduated from Harvard in 1937. He summered with his family at Woods Hole on Cape Cod, where he became involved during the early 1930s with the "University Players," at West Falmouth. There he met the then unknown performers James Stewart and Henry Fonda, with whom he later shared accommodations while he struggled to establish himself.

Career 
Bacon's acting career failed to progress, and he drifted for several years. He moved to New York City, where he was sponsored by a wealthy British patron, and although he once again failed to secure employment, he began to wear expensive clothes and jewelry, leading to speculation that he was acting as a gigolo.

He moved to Los Angeles, where he met and married Austrian singer and actress Greta Keller, eleven years his senior, in 1942. In her later years, Keller disclosed that Bacon was homosexual, and that she was lesbian, and that their lavender marriage partly served as what she referred to as a "beard", allowing both of them to maintain the requisite facade in Hollywood, where they were both attempting to establish film careers.

In 1942, Howard Hughes met Bacon, and signed him to an exclusive contract, with the intention of casting him in The Outlaw (1943) as Billy the Kid. Bacon screen tested for the role and was found unsuitable. Though Hughes later decided not to use Bacon in The Outlaw, replacing him with actor Jack Beutel, he kept Bacon to the terms of his contract, casting him in several smaller roles, usually as college boys. Keller alleged that there was a homosexual relationship between Hughes and Bacon, and she blamed the alleged relationship for Bacon's being replaced. Hughes, however, was widely known as a womanizer and was often the target of unscrupulous claims to cash in on his money. Later, Hughes did lend Bacon for a role in the Republic serial The Masked Marvel (1943). The serial was produced with a low budget, and marked a low point in Bacon's career, with Keller recalling that he was completely humiliated. Today it remains his best remembered work.

Death 
On September 12, 1943, Bacon was seen driving a car erratically in Santa Monica, California, before running off the road and into the curb. Several witnesses saw him climb out of the car and stagger briefly before collapsing. As they approached he asked them to help him, but he died before he could say anything more. A small puncture wound was found in his back; the weapon had punctured his lung and caused his death. A weapon was never found, though the wound was suggested to be from a stiletto. Keller, who was then five months pregnant, collapsed when she heard of her husband's death.
She was inconsolable and was given sedatives by Bacon's brother, a doctor. On September 20, eight days after Bacon's death, Keller went into labor and delivered a stillborn.

When he died, Bacon was wearing only a swimsuit, and a wallet and camera were found in his car. Also in his car was a small sweater not belonging to Bacon. Allegedly, the film from the camera was developed and found to contain only one image, that of Bacon, nude and smiling on a beach. The case attracted publicity for a time and remains unsolved.

David Bacon was cremated at Cunningham & O'Connor Mortuary in Santa Monica. His cremains were shipped to Massachusetts, where they were interred at Woods Hole Village Cemetery (also known as Church of the Messiah Memorial Garden) in Woods Hole, Massachusetts.

See also
List of unsolved murders

References

Further reading
 Howard Hughes, The Untold Story. p. 100, Brown and Broske, DaCapo Press 1996

External links

Cape Cod Confidential - The Death of David Bacon
Who Killed The Masked Marvel

1914 births
1943 deaths
20th-century American male actors
American male film actors
American male stage actors
Burials in Massachusetts
Deaths by stabbing in California
Deerfield Academy alumni
American gay actors
Harvard University alumni
LGBT people from Massachusetts
Male actors from Massachusetts
People from Barnstable, Massachusetts
People murdered in California
Unsolved murders in the United States
Road incident deaths in California
20th-century American LGBT people